Conan the Barbarian by Robert E. Howard was first adapted into comics in 1952 in Mexico. Marvel Comics began publishing Conan comics with the series Conan the Barbarian in 1970. Dark Horse Comics published Conan from 2003 to 2018, when the rights were reacquired by Marvel Comics. Marvel published Conan comics until 2022, and Titan Comics took over the license from Heroic Signatures to begin publishing its own series.

La reina de la Costa Negra
The first comic book adaptation of a Howard Conan story was the feature La reina de la Costa Negra (taken from the original Conan story, "Queen of the Black Coast") in the miniature-size Mexican anthology title Cuentos de Abuelito #8 (1952) published by Corporacion Editorial Mexicana, SA. The series features the main characters, Conan and Bêlit, though Conan is depicted as blond rather than black-haired. Issues 8 through 12 adapted the original Howard story, while subsequent issues featured original material. The feature ran in nearly every issue of Cuentos de Abuelito up through number 61. A digest-sized standalone series, La reina de la Costa Negra, was published by Ediciones Mexicanas Asocidas in 1958–1959 which lasted for at least eleven issues. In 1965–66 Ediciones Joma published a standard-size La reina de la Costa Negra comic that ran for at least 53 issues.

Marvel Comics

Marvel Comics introduced a version of Conan in 1970 with Conan the Barbarian, written by Roy Thomas with art initially by Barry Windsor-Smith, then John Buscema and Ernie Chan (aka Ernie Chua). The successful Conan the Barbarian series spawned the more adult, black-and-white Savage Sword of Conan in 1974, by Thomas, Buscema, and Alfredo Alcala. Savage Sword of Conan soon became one of the most popular comic series in the 1970s.

The Marvel Conan stories were also adapted as a newspaper comic strip which appeared daily and Sunday from September 4, 1978, to April 12, 1981. Originally written by Roy Thomas and illustrated by John Buscema, the strip was continued by several different Marvel artists and writers.

Other Marvel Conan titles over the years include Savage Tales (1971–1975, issues 1–5 only), Giant-Size Conan (1974–1975), King Conan/Conan the King (1980–1989), Conan the Adventurer (1994–1995), Conan (1995–1996), and Conan the Savage (1995–1996).

After the 2019 return of Conan to Marvel titles included Conan: Serpent War (2019–2020 miniseries), Conan: Battle for the Serpent Crown (2020 miniseries), alongside the reappearance of Conan the Barbarian (2019-present) and Savage Sword of Conan (2019), which both received new #1s but retained the original "Legacy Numbering" continuing where their original Marvel series left off.

Conan later appeared in the pages of Savage Avengers.

King Conan caused controversy when it included a character named Matoaka, the real name of Pocahontas, and with a sexualized design and a backstory similar to that of the actual Native American woman. There was backlash at what was perceived a disrespectful portrayal, so Marvel announced that name would be changed in later issues, reprints and digital editions. Writer Jason Aaron issued an apology, and pointed that "This new character is a supernatural, thousand-year-old princess of a cursed island within a world of pastiche and dark fantasy and was never intended to be based on anyone from history".

Marvel Epic Collections

Awards
Academy of Comic Book Arts Shazam Awards:

1970
Best New Talent: Barry Smith

1971
Best Continuing Feature: Conan the Barbarian
Best Writer (Dramatic): Roy Thomas

1973
Best Individual Story (Dramatic): "Song of Red Sonja" from Conan the Barbarian #24 by Roy Thomas and Barry Smith

1974
Best Continuing Feature: Conan the Barbarian
Best Penciller (Dramatic): John Buscema
Superior Achievement by an Individual: Roy Thomas

Dark Horse Comics

Dark Horse Comics began their take on Conan in 2003, which ended in 2018 when the rights were repurchased by Marvel.

The first comic series published was written by Kurt Busiek and Tim Truman and pencilled by Cary Nord and Tomas Giorello. This was followed by Conan the Cimmerian, written by Tim Truman and pencilled by Tomas Giorello, Richard Corben and José Villarrubia. This series was a fresh interpretation, based solely on the works of Robert E. Howard and on the Dale Rippke chronology, with no connection to the large Marvel run.

Dark Horse Comics also published digitally re-coloured compilations of the 1970s Marvel Comics Conan the Barbarian series in graphic-novel format, by Roy Thomas (writer), Barry Windsor-Smith, John Buscema, Ernie Chan (artists), and others.

Creative teams
Kurt Busiek (writer) and Cary Nord (artist) (2003–2006)
Tim Truman (writer) and Cary Nord (artist) (2007)
Tim Truman (writer) and Tomas Giorello (artist) (2008)
Tim Truman (writer) and Tomas Giorello (artist), Richard Corben (artist 2008), José Villarrubia (colorist) (2008–2018)

Awards
2004 Will Eisner Comic Industry Awards
Best Single Issue or One-Shot: Conan #0: The Legend
2004 Eagle Awards
Favourite new comicbook: Conan

Glénat
In France, the character is under public domain, and on the Franco-Belgian market, the publisher Glénat has, since 2018, published a series of albums with the character, "Conan le Cimmérien", written and drawn by local talent."Conan le Cimmérien", listing on Bedetheque.

Weird Book 
In Italy, the collective Leviathan Labs publishes a version by the publisher Weird Book.

DQómics  
In 2021, the Spanish publisher DQómics  Conan de Cimmeria, written by Ángel G. Nieto with drawings by Julio Rod and colors by Esteban Navarro.

Titles

Conan series

Annuals 

 Newspaper Strip (September 4, 1978 – April 12, 1981), ?? strips.

Miniseries

‡ Conan and the Demons of Khitai #3 featured a spoof nude advert for Conan #24–after complaints a second printing was issued replacing the spoof nude advert with the actual (non-nude) advert for Conan #24, with retailers offering the option to swap copies. (See Recalled comics for more pulped, recalled and erroneous comics.)

One-Shots

Graphic novels

Other series

Miscellaneous

Reprints

 Robert E Howard's Conan: The Frost-Giant's Daughter

Adaptations

Miscellaneous or parody appearances
 National Lampoon (May 1972)
 Mad magazine #340, October 1995 Superhero High School (with Archie's Jughead)
 Captain Carrot and His Amazing Zoo Crew! (DC, 1982), issue 7. Written by Roy Thomas: Bow-Zar the Barkbarian.
 What The--?! #12 versus Groo (Goo) among others such as Hot Stuff and Yogi the Bear and Frosty the Snowman.
 UHF in a dream sequence titled Conan the Librarian (1989).
Discworld (novels) by Terry Pratchett, featuring a parody character called "Cohen the Barbarian"
 The Flesh'', a modified Conan the Barbarian action figure

Footnotes

Sources

External links
Conan official website
Dark Horse Comics Conan Zone

 
Characters created by Roy Thomas
Characters created by Barry Windsor-Smith
Comics characters introduced in 1970